The Canvas A1 is a phone co-developed by Google as its Android One initiative and Micromax that runs the Android (operating system). The initiative was started by Google to provide an affordable yet feature-rich smartphone for developing nations, India being the first. The initiative is headed by Sundar Pichai.

Specifications

Hardware
Canvas A1 is powered by a 1.3 GHz quad-core Mediatek MT6582 processor with 1 GB of RAM, A dual-core Mali - 400 MP2 GPU And with 4 GB of internal storage which is expandable up to 32 GB through a microSD card slot. It features a 1700 mAh Li-Po battery. The Canvas A1 has a 4.5-inch screen with 480x854 pixels resolution (218 PPI) IPS LCD display, and includes a 5-megapixel rear-facing camera with [autofocus] and a 2.0 megapixel front-facing camera.
It has an LED Notification light which glows in green and red colours.
It has usual sensors like proximity sensor, Gravity sensor, Accelerometer, and Gyroscope Sensor.
This phone follows FCC SAR standard. The SAR limit recommended by the FCC is 1.6 W/kg.The highest SAR value tested for this phone model is 0.24 W/kg @ 1g (Head) W/kg @ 1 g(Head) and 0.93 W/kg @ 1g (Body) W/Kg @ 1g(Body).
In June 2015, Micromax Rolled out a refreshed version which had twice the internal storage (8GB) and Android 5.1.1 Lollipop Pre-installed.

References

Android (operating system) devices
Micromax Mobile
Discontinued smartphones